Route 214 is a  state highway in the U.S. state of Rhode Island. Its southern terminus is at Route 138A in Middletown, and its northern terminus is at Route 114 in Middletown.

Route description
Route 214 begins at the intersection of Aquidneck Avenue, which carries Route 138A, and Valley Road in Middletown.  Heading north on Valley Road, the highway parallels the eastern short of Green End Pond.  North of the pond, the road passes through a residential area before reaching the Main Street commercial district at Route 138.  From there, it continues to the north and northwest where it ends at Route 114 (Main Road).

Major intersections

References

External links

2019 Highway Map, Rhode Island

214
Transportation in Newport County, Rhode Island